Franz Maria Liedig (2 February 1900, Hünfeld – 30 March 1967, Munich) was a Kriegsmarine officer and member of the military resistance against Adolf Hitler.

Biography
Liedig volunteered the German Imperial Navy in October 1916, was educated at the Naval Academy Mürwik and served as an Artillery Officer on a Torpedo boat. After a short time of internment at Scapa Flow in 1919, he started to study at the Technical University Munich. Liedig was a member of the Freikorps Marinebrigade Ehrhardt, deployed in Berlin and Upper Silesia in 1919/20, and a participant of the Kapp Putsch in March 1920. Liedig left the navy in September 1920 and was active in some rightwing organisations throughout the 1920s. Liedig studied law and worked as a lawyer.

In 1936 he joined the Kriegsmarine at the instigation of Admiral Wilhelm Canaris, who knew Liedig from the Freikorps episode. Here he came in contact to members of the German military resistance such as Hans Oster and Hans von Dohnanyi. Around September 20, 1938 the leading members of that opposition Erwin von Witzleben, Hans Bernd Gisevius, Hans Oster, Hans von Dohnanyi, and assumedly Carl Friedrich Goerdeler met Abwehr Captain Friedrich Wilhelm Heinz and Franz-Maria Liedig at Oster’s house in Berlin. Heinz and Liedig were instructed to form an assault group to arrest Adolf Hitler. After Witzleben left that meeting, both decided to shoot Hitler if possible. The plans were abolished after the Munich Conference.

On October 8, 1939 Liedig drove Hans Oster to the Dutch Military attaché in Berlin, Colonel Bert Sas. After Oster returned to the car, he told Liedig, that he just committed treason. In fact Oster informed Sas about the planned date of attack of the German Wehrmacht in the West.

In 1940 Liedig became the Military attaché at the German embassy in Sofia and later on in Athens. In February 1944 he was removed as the First Officer of the German cruiser Köln in Oslo.

After von Dohnanyi, Oster and Canaris were arrested by the Gestapo and the 20 July plot failed, the plans of 1938 were found on September 22, 1944 at the Abwehr and Liedig was arrested in November 1944. He was imprisoned at several concentration camps like Flossenbürg, Buchenwald, Dachau and finally transferred to Niederdorf amongst about 140 prominent inmates in late April 1945, where the SS left them behind.

Liedig was a founding member of the Christian Social Union of Bavaria in 1946 and their political executive in 1946 – 48.

Liedig died in 1967.

References

External links
Marineoffiziere in der Widerstandsbewegung - Fregattenkapitän Dr. Franz-Maria Liedig

1900 births
1967 deaths
German resistance members
20th-century Freikorps personnel
Imperial German Navy personnel of World War I
Reichsmarine personnel
Kriegsmarine personnel
Kapp Putsch participants